German settlement in the Philippines began during the Spanish colonization of the Philippines when the German Empire attempted to acquire the Philippines. This article also refers to the choice of Filipino citizenship and/or settlement in the Philippines by persons of either pure or mixed German descent who continued to reside in the country for a significant number of years or decades. The German community in the Philippines is the largest central European community in the country. The community comprises expats and immigrants.

History

Spanish rule
The first Germans to arrive to the Philippines were colonists. Otto von Bismarck’s German Empire was one of the United States' rivals in replacing Spanish rule in the archipelago.  From 1890 to the outbreak of the Spanish–American War in 1898, there was a lull in German Empire's colonial campaigns. Like other colonialist nations, German Empire sought to protect its overseas nationals and trade interests to the extent of safeguarding free access to markets. A German squadron arrived in Manila and engaged in maneuvers which Commodore George Dewey seeing this as obstruction of his blockade, offered war — after which the Germans backed down.

First Philippine Republic
The Battle of Manila Bay took place on 1 May 1898, following the outbreak of the Spanish–American War. The German Emperor expected an American defeat, with Spain left in a sufficiently weak position for the revolutionaries to capture Manila—leaving the Philippines ripe for German picking. Following the American victory in the war, the Philippines and the Far East were brought to the attention of the world and Germany recognized the great potentialities of the islands as a major commercial market.

On 12 June, the day the Philippines declared its independence from Spain, Vice-Admiral Otto von Diederichs arrived in Manila Bay. The number of German war vessels in Philippine waters increased to three. Earlier, on 6 and 9 May, respectively, the German ships Irene and the Cormoran arrived in the bay with a separate instruction from the German government, mainly to protect German nationals in Manila. German's interest in the Philippines was cut short with the signing of the Treaty of Paris on 10 December 1898. The Philippines was finally annexed by the United States in 1899.

American period
The Philippines was part of the United States between 1898 and 1946. During the era of the Philippine Commonwealth, 1935–1946, Jewish refugees including German Jews from Europe sought a safe haven in Manila. The migration of Jews escaping Europe between 1935 and 1941 was the last major immigration of Jews to the Philippines. The first German Jews to arrive in Manila actually came from the Jewish community in Shanghai. With the occupation of Peking by the Japanese in 1937, the four million inhabitants of Shanghai were endangered. Germany's shift of alliance from China to Japan at this time alarmed German Jews in Shanghai, fearing German pressure on Japan to adopt Nazi anti-Jewish policies. Fearing for them as well, the Jewish Community in Manila, led by the Frieder Brothers of Cincinnati, organized the Jewish Refugee Committee of Manila (JRC) with the intention of rescuing German members of the Shanghai Jewish community.

Modern era
In recent years, several German businesses have set up shops in the Philippines, and a number of Germans have chosen the Philippines as their new residence. In the Philippines, since its formation in January 1906, the German Club has provided a place of respite and interaction for Germans and Filipinos alike. The Germans in the Philippines are also well integrated and also contribute to the business sector of the Philippines. In the past century, it has stood witness to the country's unfolding history and today enjoys the regular patronage of members and guests at its current location in Legaspi Village, Makati.

Notable Filipinos of German descent

 Christopher de Leon - Actor
 Michael de Mesa - Actor
 Krista K - Model
 Carla Abellana - Actress
 Ivan Dorschner - Actor, model
 Paolo Duterte - Businessman
 William Beier -  Figure ice skating
 Jestoni Alarcon - Actor
 Panchito Alba - Actor active from the 1950s through the 1990s, FAMAS Award recipient
 Arjo Atayde - Actor
 Ria Atayde - Actress
 Rita Avila - Actress
 Kurt Bachmann - Basketball player, Philippine National Team
 Charles Borck - Basketball player
 Aleck Bovick - Actress
 Michele Bumgarner - Racing driver
 Felix Brawner Jr. - Army brigadier general
 Romeo A. Brawner - Former Commissioner, COMELEC 
 Sara Duterte-Carpio - 15th Vice President of the Philippines
 Alan Peter Cayetano - Senator, Secretary of Foreign Affairs
 Lino Cayetano - Director, producer
 Pia Cayetano - Senator, representative
 Mark Cojuangco - Politician
 Will Devaughn - Actor
 Etang Discher - Actress 1930s–1950s 
 Lilia Dizon - Actress
 Mathew Dumba - Ice hockey player
 Andi Eigenmann - Actress
 Gabby Eigenmann - Actor
 Geoff Eigenmann - Actor
 Ryan Eigenmann - Actor
 Maike Evers - Model, VJ
 E. J. Feihl - Basketball player
 Gerphil Flores - Soprano
 Amalia Fuentes - Actress
 Baron Geisler - Actor
 Donald Geisler - Businessman, former athlete
 Melody Gersbach -  Beauty pageant contestant
 Cherie Gil - Actress
 Enrique Gil - Actor, commercial model, dancer, performer
 Mark Gil - Actor
 Nikki Gil - Actress, singer
 Roxanne Guinoo - Star Circle Teen Quest contestant, model and actress
 Edward Hagedorn - Puerto Princesa City mayor
 Christine Jacob - TV personality
 Jaclyn Jose - Actress
 Bianca King - Actress
 Krista Kleiner - Beauty pageant contestant
 Doug Kramer - PBA basketball player, model
 Helga Krapf - Actress
 Juan Karlos Labajo - Actor, singer
 Renaldo Lapuz - Musician, singer-songwriter
 Laura Lehmann - Beauty pageant contestant
 Katharina Lehnert - Tennis player
 Gabriel de Leon - Actor
 Malaya Lewandowski - Actress, singer
 Sid Lucero - Actor, model
 Eddie Mesa - Actor 1950s–1990s
 Colby Miller - MTV Asia VJ
 Ara Mina - Actress
 Jewel Mische - Actress
 Julia Montes - ABS-CBN Actress
 Aga Muhlach - Actor, model, product endorser
 Niño Muhlach - Actor
 Diether Ocampo  - Actor, model
 Paraluman - Actress, FAMAS Award recipient
 Gina Pareño - Actress
 Piolo Pascual - Model, film and television actor, musician
 Polo Ravales - Actor
 Delia Razon - Actress
 John Regala - Actor, Christian minister and environmentalist
 Cristine Reyes - Actress
 Alden Richards - Actor
 Christopher Ricketts - Martial arts instructor, actor
 Ronnie Ricketts - Actor, fight director, martial arts instructor, film producer and director
 Ross Rival - Actor
 Rosanna Roces - Actress
 Lana Roi - Singer, model
 Jen Rosendahl - Actress
 Lou Salvador - former basketball player turned film producer
 Lou Salvador, Jr. - former teen star during 1950s
 Nadine Samonte - Starstruck Season 1 contestant, model, actress
 Empress Schuck - Actress
 Imelda Schweighart- Beauty titleholder
 Sandra Seifert - Beauty pageant contestant
 Mary Walter - Actress 1920s–1990s
 Freddie Webb - Actor, former politician, former athlete
 Pinky Webb - Broadcasting journalist, newscaster
 Valerie Weigmann - actress, TV host, fashion model, beauty pageant titleholder
 Pia Wurtzbach - actress, model, Miss Universe 2015
 The Zobel de Ayala family - successful Filipino business family
 Zaldy Zshornack - actor

See also
 History of the Jews in the Philippines
 Filipinos in Germany
 Germany–Philippines relations

References

 
European diaspora in the Philippines
Philippines
German diaspora in Asia
Germany–Philippines relations